Fort Mountain State Park is a  Georgia state park located between Chatsworth and Ellijay on Fort Mountain. The state park was founded in 1938 and is named for an ancient  rock wall located on the peak. The nomination form for the National Register of Historic Places describes the wall as "more of a marker than a fortification, separating the north peak from the southern end."

History
Fort Mountain State Park officially opened in 1936 on land donated by Ivan Allen, Sr. The park was originally . The Civilian Conservation Corps built many of the park's facilities, such as the stone fire tower, the lake, the trails and some park buildings.

Ancient wall
The state park derived its name from an ancient  rock wall located on the peak. The zigzagging wall contains 19 or 29 pits scattered along the wall, in addition to a ruin of a gateway. The wall was constructed out of local stones from the surrounding regions around the summit. A 1956 archaeological report concluded only that the structure "represents a prehistoric aboriginal construction whose precise age and nature cannot yet be safely hazarded until the whole problem, of which this is a representative, has been more fully investigated," while a modern online tourist website states that the wall was built by local Native Americans around 500 AD for religious purposes.

There are several legends concerning the wall. One legend claims that the wall is a remnant of one of the several stone forts legendary Welsh explorer Madoc and his group built throughout the present-day United States. The wall has also been related to the "moon-eyed people" of Cherokee lore. Other speculations of the wall's origins and purposes have included a fortification for Hernando de Soto's conquistadors and a honeymoon haven for Cherokee newlyweds.  A plaque mentioning the Madoc/Welsh legend and the "moon-eyed Indians" was in the park, but has been removed.

Description
Situated in the Chattahoochee National Forest, Fort Mountain State Park offers many outdoor activities, such as hiking, mountain biking, and horseback riding. There are more than 25 miles of trails inside the park, including paved and unpaved trails. The park is also known for its unique scenery, a mixture of both hardwood and pine forests, several blueberry thickets, and waterfalls. In addition, the park contains a  mountain lake. Atop Fort Mountain itself is a tower constructed by members of the Civilian Conservation Corps (CCC). Picnic shelters and the trails to the rock wall were also constructed by the CCC.

The summit of a different mountain in the south-southwest part of the park contains a radio tower for Georgia Public Broadcasting, transmitting TV station WCLP-TV (now WNGH-TV) since 1967; and radio station WNGH-FM since May 2008.

The park is accessible via Woody Glenn Highway (Georgia 2 and Georgia 52).

Gallery

See also

References

Notes

Citations

External links

Fort Mountain State Park Official
"Whites built mystery of Fort Mountain, but not stone wall"
The Overlook Inn, Fort Mountain Lodging

State parks of Georgia (U.S. state)
State parks of the Appalachians
1936 establishments in Georgia (U.S. state)
Protected areas of Murray County, Georgia